Lophozia is a genus of liverworts belonging to the family Lophoziaceae.

The genus was first described by Barthélemy Charles Joseph Dumortier.

The genus has cosmopolitan distribution.

Species:
 Lophozia collaris
 Lophozia longidens

References

Jungermanniales
Jungermanniales genera